Xóm Rộc is a central hamlet of Mai Xa village in Quang Tri, Vietnam.  Economic interests include water spinach, fishing and catching small clams.

Populated places in Quảng Trị province